The second season of The Celebrity Apprentice Australia began airing on 18 April 2012 on the Nine Network. The series was commissioned in late 2011 following the popularity of the first celebrity season, and will be the third edition of The Apprentice Australia overall. The official cast was announced in January 2012, with filming beginning on 15 January 2012. Mark Bouris returned as CEO, with his son Dane replacing Brad Seymour as boardroom advisor, alongside Deborah Thomas. TV personality Ian "Dicko" Dickson was the celebrity winner, defeating reality star Nathan Jolliffe in the final boardroom.

Candidates
Following the success of the first series it was reported that many Australian celebrities had expressed interest in participating in a second series of the show. Reports regarding the participation of Chopper Read, Nikki Webster, Kris Smith, Julie Goodwin and Stephen Belafonte as candidates failed to eventuate, with media reporting in early January 2012 that David Hassellhoff was set to appear in the series alongside former MasterChef Australia contestant Marion Grasby and The Amazing Race Australia winner Nathan Jolliffe, as well as other expected candidates including Ian Dickson and former Australian rules footballer Jason Akermanis. These celebrities were all confirmed as candidates on 16 January 2012, with the full line-up of participants also consisting of Patti Newton, Charlotte Dawson, Lauryn Eagle, Vince Sorrenti, Fiona O'Loughlin, Ben Dark and Tania Zaetta. It has also been confirmed that Hasselhoff will be raising money for Surf Life Saving Australia, while Newton and Dawson's chosen charities are SIDS for Kids and the Smile Foundation respectively.

Weekly results

 The candidate was on the losing team.
 The candidate won the competition and was named the Celebrity Apprentice.
 The candidate won as project manager on his/her team.
 The candidate lost as project manager on his/her team.
 The candidate was brought to the final boardroom.
 The candidate was fired.
 The candidate lost as project manager and was fired.
 The candidate quit the competition.

Tasks
Unlike last season, the show aired 2 episodes a week and each episode had the challenge and the boardroom.

Task 1

Airdate: 18 April 2012 (Task & Boardroom)
Fortune's Project manager: Tania Zaetta
Platinum's Project manager: David Hasselhoff
Task: To create and operate a celebrity dog washing and pampering experience.
Winning team: Platinum
Reasons for victory: Team Platinum focused more on corporate dollars and high end donations. The price for a dog wash was set at $500, in order to earn more money whilst washing less dogs. David Hasslehoff was also able to promote the event and draw larger crowds.
Losing team: Fortune
Reasons for loss: Despite many team members bringing in large donations, they did not bring in as much as the men. Additionally, the women set their wash prices much lower, as to not turn away the general public, a strategy that backfired, leaving them with more work and less money to show for it.
Sent to Boardroom: Tania Zaetta, Lauryn Eagle, Fiona O'Loughlin
Fired: Fiona O'Loughlin- For bringing in the least amount of money. Despite her personality and drive to do well, Fiona relied solely on one donation that ended up falling through.
Notes:
David Hasslehoff won $245,000 for his charity
During the challenge, Fiona approached David and asked him to donate 25% of the men's earnings to the women. David refused. It was later revealed in the boardroom that Project Manager Tania was unaware of this.
Lauryn also crossed over to the men's team in order to try and steal some of their waiting clients. Tania was unhappy that Lauryn was constantly away from the women's team and not working on their own clients.
Team Fortune was criticised in the boardroom for not using Patti's bigger celebrity status to combat David's.

Task 2

Airdate: 19 April 2012 (Task & Boardroom)
Fortune's Project manager: Marion Grasby
Platinum's Project manager: Ian "Dicko" Dickson
Task: To create a pop-up shop in Sydney's infamous harbour side location, 'The Rocks' and raise money by auctioning off art. Each team member had to create a piece of art that represented a significant memory of their life, as well as a team artwork. $20,000 was also given to the team that offered the best experience on the day.
Winner: Platinum
Reasons for victory: Team Platinum raised $134,253 in the auction. Additionally, the men were also judged as having the better experience, and won an extra $20,000.
Losing team: Fortune
Reasons for loss: Team Fortune only managed to raise $70,120. Even if that had won the extra $20,000, it would still not be enough to beat the men.
Sent to Boardroom: Marion Grasby, David Hasselhoff, Tania Zaetta
Fired: Marion Grasby - for being an unsuccessful Project manager. Even though the rest of the team believed that Tania should be fired, she had bought in the most money for the team for the second week in a row. Additionally, Marion was deemed as not having the harsher, more upfront personality to continue forward in the competition.
Notes:
Ian "Dicko" Dickson raised $154,253 for his charity.
Patti and David swapped teams for this challenge at the request of Mr. Bouris.
Mr Bouris gave Dicko the opportunity to give the money Team Fortune had made back to them for Marion's Charity. He gladly accepted.
Initially, Ben Dark appeared to also want the title of project manager when choosing leaders, but eventually stepped aside after words with Dicko. Ben and Dicko continued to butt heads over the duration of the challenge.
Tania accused Lauryn of talking over Marion and the other team members during the boardroom. Both Lauryn and Charlotte denied this, and argued that it was Tania who talked over others.
Nathan was praised for bringing in large donations in consecutive challenges ($35,000 & $40,000).

Task 3

Airdate: 25 April 2012 (Task & Boardroom)
Fortune's Project manager: Charlotte Dawson
Platinum's Project manager: Nathan Joliffe
Task: To run and perform in a hair show for Wella.
Quit: David Hassellhoff- Due to family priorities.
Winner: Fortune
Losing team: Platinum
Sent to Boardroom: Nathan Joliffe, Ian "Dicko" Dickson, Jason Akermanis
Fired: Nobody - Due to David's departure, Mr. Bouris decided that it was fair that all three stayed.
Notes:
Initially the teams were swapped back to "Men" vs "Women". However at the request of Mr Bouris, Ben Dark was moved to team Fortune to even out the teams.
Charlotte Dawson won $20,000 for her charity.

Task 4

Airdate: 26 April 2012 (Task & Boardroom)
Fortune's Project manager: Lauryn Eagle
Platinum's Project manager: Jason Akermanis
Task: To raise the most money by producing a family fun fair.
Winner: Platinum
Reasons for victory: Platinum raised more money than Team Fortune.
Losing team: Fortune
Reasons for loss: Although their fun fair was more popular and did run smoother, they didn't raise as much money as Team Platinum.
Sent to Boardroom: Lauryn Eagle, Tania Zaetta, Patti Newton
Fired: Tania Zaetta- for raising the least amount of money and causing friction throughout the team.
Notes:
Ian "Dicko" Dickson moved to team Fortune, while Charlotte Dawson was sent to team Platinum.
Jason Akermanis won $152,000 for his charity.
 Warwick Capper made a surprise reappearance to even out the numbers of the teams, joining Team Platinum for this challenge only.

Task 5

Airdate: 2 May 2012 (Task & Boardroom)
Fortune's Project manager: Vince Sorrenti
Platinum's Project manager: Ben Dark
Task: To make a publicity stunt for Yellow Brick Road to get across the message 'We Care'.
Winner: Platinum
Reasons for victory:Their campaign, which involved sleeping in the street and presenting a booklet to Australian Prime Minister Julia Gillard gained a lot of attention and focused on the message "We Care"
Losing team: Fortune
Reasons for loss: Although Team Fortune gained a lot of publicity, Mr Bouris felt as if they did not get across the message 'We Care'.
Sent to Boardroom: Vince Sorrenti, Patti Newton, Charlotte Dawson
Fired: Patti Newton- for asking to be fired because she felt as if she could not bring anymore to the competition.
Notes:
The Celebrities were placed back into their teams, however due to an uneven number the girls chose Vince Sorrenti to join team Fortune.

Task 6

Airdate: 3 May 2012 (Task & Boardroom)
Fortune's Project manager: Nathan Joliffe
Platinum's Project manager: Ian "Dicko" Dickson
Task: To perform an act outlining the P&O Brand and participate in making 2 cabins with in an hour.
Winner: Fortune
Reasons for victory: Team Fortune concentrated on the P&O brand message and stuck to the main points and did a better job in customer service process.
Losing team: Platinum
Reasons for loss: Did not get the message across although the act was entertaining and only managed to clean one cabin.
Sent to Boardroom: Ian "Dicko" Dickson, Jason Akermanis, Charlotte Dawson
Fired: Jason Akermanis- for being too much of a "Maverick" and being overconfident
Notes: 
 Lauryn and Nathan kissed as part of the performance
 When Jason was fired, he pushed his chair over and swore as he left the board room, having argued with Bouris about his decision

Task 7

Airdate: 9 May 2012 (Task & Boardroom)
Fortune's Project manager: Vince Sorrenti
Platinum's Project manager: Ben Dark
Task To create a promotional event for the new BMW car.:
Winner: Platinum
Reasons for victory: Their advert was felt to be more edgy and exciting.
Losing team: Fortune
Sent to Boardroom: Ian "Dicko" Dickson, Vince Sorrenti, Charlotte Dawson
Fired: Vince Sorrenti & Charlotte Dawson- Vince and Charlotte couldn't see how their promotional advertisement was wrong, whereas Dicko admitted to 'stuffing up'.
Notes:" Double Elimination"

Task 8 (Finale)

Part 1Airdate: 10 May 2012 (Task & Boardroom)Fortune's Project manager: NonePlatinum's Project manager: NoneTask: To record a charity singleWinner: FortuneLosing team: PlatinumReasons for loss:Their single was felt to be less commercially viable.Fired: Ben Dark & Lauryn Eagle- Simply they were eligible to be fired for being on the losing teamNotes: Part 2 Airdate: 16 May 2012 (Task, Boardroom & Winner Announced)Task: Ian and Nathan must create a music video for a version of the charity song they wrote in the previous episode.Winner:  Ian "Dicko" DickinsonRunner-Up: Nathan JoliffeNotes:'''
 Each contestant got to choose three celebrities each from either this series or the previous one. Nathan chose Charlotte Dawson, Jason Akermanis and Didier Cohen. Dicko chose Patti Newton, Tania Zaetta and Jesinta Campbell

Ratings

References

Australia 2
2012 Australian television seasons